Sir Francis Ellis was an administrator of the English East India Company, and President of Bengal in 1693.

References

Presidents of Bengal
17th-century English businesspeople
British governors of Bengal